Cacicazgo is a phonetic Spanish transliteration (or a derivative) of the Taíno word for the lands ruled by a cacique.  The Spanish colonial system recognized indigenous elites as nobles in Mexico and Peru, and other areas. Nobles could entail their estates, which were called cacicazgos on the model of Spanish entailed estates, or mayorazgos.  This term is found in contexts such as "la princesa de Cofachiqui, señora de un cacigazgo indígena" or, for example: "In November of 1493, the island of Boriquén had approximately 20 cacigazgos." According to Spanish chronicles, the cacique was at the apex of the Taíno feudal structure. Bartolomé de las Casas refers to these cacigazgos as kingdoms.

Many individual cacicazgos have been studied in colonial Mexico, showing that entailment was a successful means to preserve noble indigenous resources as the situation for commoners declined.  There are cases where Spaniards married into cacique families, thereby giving them access to indigenous resources. In the Archivo General de la Nación, Mexico, a whole section of records, called Vínculos, is devoted to individual noble entailments.  A collection of them was published in 1961. Cacicazgos survived into the nineteenth century. Conflicts over inheritance were common, and the litigants' arguments found in these cases form the basis for understanding some of the dynamics of the institution. Over time, the concept of cacique shifted, with some women attaining the title of cacica. Cacicazgo likewise underwent some transformation during the colonial era in Mexico. "By law, a cacique was a single heir and possessor of a cacicazgo estate, which always included land and often a subject labor force to work it. The Indians themselves, however, saw things differently, and by late colonial times it was not unusual for all the sons and daughters of a cacique (or cacica) to adopt the title. How and why this change took place, its chronology, and what it meant for local community organization remain imperfectly understood...The late colonial setting was vastly different, and indigenous noble claims of the period must be understood in the context in which they arose."

References

Further reading

Bornemann, M. M. (2005). El cacicazgo en nueva España y Filipinas. Plaza y Valdés.
Canuto Castillo, Felipe. "“Españoles descendientes de aquéllos [indios]”. Nietos españoles de caciques indios." Nuevo Mundo Mundos Nuevos. Nouveaux mondes mondes nouveaux-Novo Mundo Mundos Novos-New world New worlds (2017).
Castañeda de la Paz, María. "Historia de una casa real. Origen y ocaso del linaje gobernante en México-Tenochtitlan." Nuevo Mundo Mundos Nuevos. Nouveaux mondes mondes nouveaux-Novo Mundo Mundos Novos-New world New worlds (2011).
Castro, María de Guadalupe Suárez. "Los privilegios y honras nobiliarias de don Juan Xiu Cimé, chilan de Oxkutzcab/The privileges and noble honors of don Juan Xiu Cimé, chilan from Oxkutzcab." Oficio. Revista de Historia e Interdisciplina 5 (2017): 47–60.
Chance, John. "The Caciques of Tecali: Class and Ethnic Identity in Late Colonial Mexico." Hispanic American Historical Review 76(3):475-502.
Cline, S.L.  “A Cacicazgo in the Seventeenth Century: The Case of Xochimilco” In Land and Politics in Mexico, H.R. Harvey, University of New Mexico Press, pp. 265–274.
Cruz Pazos, C. (2004). "Cabildos y cacicazgos: alianza y confrontación en los pueblos de indios novohispanos." Revista española de antropología americana, 34, 149–162.
Cruz Pazos, Patricia. "Indias cacicas de la Nueva España: roles, poder y género; reflexiones para un análisis." Boletín americanista 55 (2005): 41–54.
Cruz Pazos, P., Gil García, F. M., & Rojas, J. L. D. (2007). Soy descendiente de don Juan Istolinque y Guzmán. El cacicazgo de Coyoacán en el siglo xviii. Relaciones. Estudios de historia y sociedad, 28(109).
Fernández de Recas, Guillermo S., Cacicazgos y nobiliario indígena de la Nueva España. México : 351 pp. Serie:   Instituto Bibliográfico Mexicano. Publicación 1961.
Las Casas, Bartolomé. A Short Account of the Destruction of the Indies, translated by Nigel Griffin. Penguin Books, 1992. 
Monaghan, John, Arthur Joyce, and Ronald Spores. "Transformations of the indigenous cacicazgo in the nineteenth century." Ethnohistory 50, no. 1 (2003): 131–150.
Moreno, Gilda Cubillo. (2012). "Sucesión, herencia y conflicto en el linaje Istolinque, caciques de la nobleza indígena colonial de Coyoacán." Primera parte. Diario de Campo, (8), 8-14.
Moreno, Gilda Cubillo. "Sucesión, herencia y conflicto en el linaje Istolinque, caciques de la nobleza indígena colonial de Coyoacán. Segunda parte." Diario de Campo 9 (2012): 4-13.
Münch, Guido. El cacicazgo de San Juan Teotihuacan durante la colonia, 1521-1821. Mexico City: SEP, Instituto Nacional de Antropología e Historia, Centro de Investigaciones Superiores 1976.
Muriel, Josefina. Las indias caciques de Corpus Christi. No. 6. Mexico City: Universidad Nacional Autónoma de México, 1963.
Rojas, José Luis de. "Relaciones efímeras y redes permanentes: conquistadores e indígenas." e-Spania. Revue interdisciplinaire d’études hispaniques médiévales et modernes 25 (2016).
Villella, Peter B. "Indian Lords, Hispanic Gentlemen: The Salazars of Colonial Tlaxcala." The Americas 69, no. 1 (2012): 1-36.
Wiesheu Forster, Walburga. 1996, Cacigazgo y estado arcaico: la evolución de organizaciones sociopolíticas complejas. INAH (Colección Científica, 310), México.
Wood, Stephanie. "Don Diego García de Mendoza Moctezuma: A Techialoyan Mastermind?." Estudios de Cultura Náhuatl 19 (1989): 245–268.

Mesoamerica
History of Mexico
Indigenous topics of the Caribbean
Society of the Caribbean